Bad Afshan (also Romanized as Bād Afshān; also known as Bād Fashān) is a village in Tudeshk Rural District, Kuhpayeh District, Isfahan County, Isfahan Province, Iran. At the 2006 census, its population was 200, in 68 families.

References 

Populated places in Isfahan County